Görgl is a Germanic-Austrian surname. Notable people with the surname include:

 Elisabeth Görgl (born 1981), Austrian alpine ski racer
 Stephan Görgl (born 1978), Austrian alpine ski racer, brother of Elisabeth

German-language surnames